The Huntsville Depot located on the Norfolk Southern Railway line in downtown Huntsville is the oldest surviving railroad depot in Alabama and one of the oldest in the United States. Completed in 1860, the depot served as eastern division headquarters for the Memphis and Charleston Railroad. It is listed on both the Alabama Register of Landmarks and Heritage and National Register of Historic Places.

Huntsville was occupied by Union forces in 1862 during the Civil War as a strategic point on the railroad and the depot was used as a prison for Confederate soldiers. Graffiti left by the soldiers can still be seen on the walls.  The Huntsville Depot saw its last regularly scheduled passenger train, Southern Railway's The Tennessean, on March 30, 1968.  Today the Depot serves as a museum, part of the Early Works Museum.

A 0-4-0 Porter steam locomotive that was built in Pittsburgh in 1904 resides outside of the museum.

See also
Alabama Constitution Village
North Alabama Railroad Museum
List of museums in Alabama
List of transport museums

References

External links

 of adjacent freight depot

Railway stations in the United States opened in 1860
Stations along Southern Railway lines in the United States
Museums in Huntsville, Alabama
Historic American Engineering Record in Alabama
National Register of Historic Places in Huntsville, Alabama
Properties on the Alabama Register of Landmarks and Heritage
Railroad museums in Alabama
Railway stations on the National Register of Historic Places in Alabama
Transportation buildings and structures in Madison County, Alabama
Former railway stations in Alabama